Pareiorhaphis steindachneri is a species of catfish in the family Loricariidae. It is native to South America, where it occurs in the basins of the Cubatão River, the Itapocu River, and the Itajaí-Açu River in Brazil. The species reaches 14.3 cm (5.6 inches) in standard length and is believed to be a facultative air-breather.

References 

Loricariidae